The Wesachewan River is a short river in the Hudson Bay drainage basin in census division No. 22 (Thompson-North Central) of Northern Manitoba, Canada.

The main channel from Vermilyea Lake is the east channel (given here as the primary source in the Infobox on the right), which is straighter and  shorter than its twin ( versus ) than the west channel (given here as the secondary source). The length of the river given in the Infobox is the length using the shorter east channel.

The river's waters eventually flow via the Gods River and the Hayes River into Hudson Bay.

See also
List of rivers of Manitoba

References

Rivers of Northern Manitoba
Tributaries of Hudson Bay